Gouden Pijl, is an elite men's and women's professional road bicycle racing criterium held annually in Emmen, the Netherlands. The first edition was in 1976 and since 2003 the event also includes a women's race.

Honours

Men's 

Source

Women's 

Source

References

External links
 

Men's road bicycle races
Women's road bicycle races
Recurring sporting events established in 1976
1976 establishments in the Netherlands
Cycling in Drenthe
Sports competitions in Emmen, Netherlands